Ebuka Rufus Izundu (born 28 June 1996) is a Nigerian professional basketball player for FMP of the Basketball League of Serbia and the Adriatic League. Izundu played college basketball for the Miami Hurricanes.

Early life and high school career
Izundu was born and brought up in Lagos, Nigeria. He grew up playing soccer and began playing basketball at age 16 due to his height. Izundu played basketball for Victory Christian Center School in Charlotte, North Carolina for two years. As a senior, he averaged 21 points, 15 rebounds and six blocks per game. Izundu also played soccer and ran track in high school. On 12 November 2014, he committed to play college basketball for Charlotte. However, he reopened his recruitment after the program parted ways with head coach Alan Major. On 13 May 2015, Izundu committed to Miami (Florida).

College career
Izundu played four years of college basketball for Miami, mostly coming off the bench until his senior season. As a sophomore, Izundu averaged 4.2 points and 3.0 rebounds per game. He averaged 5.0 points and 3.8 rebounds per game as a junior. On 13 November 2018, he posted career-highs of 22 points and 18 rebounds in a 96–58 win over Stephen F. Austin. As a senior, Izundu started in all 32 games and averaged 10.9 points, 8.3 rebounds and 1.2 blocks per game, shooting a school-record 65.3 percent from the field.

Professional career
Izundu joined the Golden State Warriors for 2019 NBA Summer League and recorded 14 points and 11 rebounds in his finale, an 88–87 loss to the Los Angeles Lakers. On 10 August 2019, Izundu signed a two-year contract with Real Betis of the Liga ACB. On 27 October, he scored a season-high 11 points in an 86–81 victory over Andorra. Izundu parted ways with Real Betis on 26 April 2020 and finished the season averaging 4.2 points and 3.1 rebounds in 13.1 minutes per game.

On July 17, 2020, he has signed with SIG Strasbourg of the LNB Pro A. In January 2021, Izundu signed for Serbian team FMP. On July 14, 2021, he signed a two-year contract extension with FMP.

References

External links
Miami Hurricanes bio

1996 births
Living people
ABA League players
Basketball League of Serbia players
Centers (basketball)
KK FMP players
Miami Hurricanes men's basketball players
Nigerian expatriate basketball people in France
Nigerian expatriate basketball people in Serbia
Nigerian expatriate basketball people in Spain
Nigerian expatriate basketball people in the United States
Nigerian men's basketball players
Real Betis Baloncesto players
SIG Basket players
Sportspeople from Lagos
21st-century Nigerian people